Thomas Janjigian (born November 10, 1994) is an American soccer player who currently plays for USL Championship side Hartford Athletic. He is of Armenian descent.

Career

Amateur and college

Janjigian played high school soccer from 2009 to 2011 at Amador Valley High School. He spent four years playing college soccer at UC Irvine between 2013 and 2016, where he scored 3 goals in 74 appearances.

Janjigian also appeared for USL PDL sides OC Pateadores Blues and FC Golden State Force.

Professional

Reno 1868 
On March 24, 2017, Janjigian signed with USL Championship club Reno 1868 FC. He made his professional debut the following day in a 2–0 loss to Orange County SC. Janjigian made his first appearance for Reno's Major League Soccer affiliate, the San Jose Earthquakes, on June 14, 2017, coming on for the injured Florian Jungwirth in the 73rd minute of San Jose's 2–0 U.S. Open Cup victory over the San Francisco Deltas. He was also one of five Reno players called up to play in the Earthquakes' July 14 friendly against Eintracht Frankfurt, and substituted on during the 4–1 victory for Cordell Cato in the 33rd minute. Reno folded their team on November 6, 2020, due to the financial impact of the COVID-19 pandemic.

Hartford Athletic 
On January 22, 2021 Janjigian signed with USL Championship team Hartford Athletic. He made his debut for Harford on April 30, 2021 in a win vs. New York Red Bulls II.

References

External links
 
 UC Irvine bio
 

1994 births
Living people
American soccer players
Association football defenders
FC Golden State Force players
Hartford Athletic players
OC Pateadores Blues players
People from Pleasanton, California
Reno 1868 FC players
Soccer players from California
Sportspeople from Alameda County, California
UC Irvine Anteaters men's soccer players
USL Championship players
USL League Two players
De Anza Force players